Bay Shore may refer to a location in the United States:

Bay Shore, Michigan, a census-designated place
Bay Shore, New York, a hamlet and census-designated place in the Town of Islip
Bay Shore High School
Bay Shore Hose Company No. 1 Firehouse
Bay Shore (LIRR station), a railroad station
Bay Shore Methodist Episcopal Church
Bay Shore, Washington, former community
Bay Shore Beach, Hampton, Virginia
Bay Shore Historic District, Miami, Florida

Sports 
Bay Shore Stakes, horse race run at Aqueduct Racetrack in Queens, New York
Bay Shore Brawlers, semi-pro football team based in Laurence Harbor, New Jersey

See also
Bayshore (disambiguation)